Artillery are a Danish thrash metal band. They participated in the early development of the genre, and their highly energetic, riff-centric and often fast-paced music is similar in style to that of Voivod, Coroner, Megadeth, and Sabbat from the same era. After releasing three full-length albums and touring extensively throughout the 1980s and early 1990s, Artillery disbanded in 1991, but reunited seven years later, only to disband once again in 2000. However, they reformed again in 2007 and are still together today.

History
The band formed in June 1982 in Taastrup, a suburb of Copenhagen by drummer Carsten Nielsen and guitarist Jørgen Sandau while they were visiting Mercyful Fate at their rehearsal room. Later on they agreed to name the band Artillery from the track "Heavy Artillery" from Tank's album Filth Hounds of Hades. After trying several musicians, the line up became guitarists Jørgen Sandau and Michael Stützer, bassist Morten Stützer, drummer Carsten Nielsen and singer Carsten Lohmann . The group recorded the demos "We Are the Dead" (1983), "Shellshock" and "Deeds of Darkness" in 1984.

Artillery's first commercial debut came in early 1985 with the inclusion of the song "Hey Woman," on Volume One of the Speed Metal Hell compilation series which was released on New Renaissance Records.  Later that year, Carsten Lohmann left and was replaced by Flemming Rönsdorf.  Later the same year, Artillery recorded a fourth demo, Fear of Tomorrow, signed with Neat Records, and released their first album, also titled Fear of Tomorrow. In 1986, Carsten Nielsen was contacted by Quorthon of Bathory asking him if he was interested in drumming for Bathory. Nielsen turned down the offer since he thought Artillery would become a much bigger band than Bathory. Their second album, Terror Squad, was released in 1987.

Guitarist Jørgen Sandau Putza left the band in 1989. Bassist Morten Stützer took over his position, lending the bass to recruit Peter Thorslund. Same year Artillery traveled to Tashkent, USSR (currently the capital of Uzbekistan), where they performed at a local music festival. Their third album, By Inheritance, was released in 1990 on both LP and CD, by Roadrunner Records and included a song called "7:00 from Tashkent". Artillery disbanded in 1991, some of the members pursuing musical projects of their own during the rest of the 1990s.

Following the 1998 release of an Artillery compilation CD, Deadly Relics by Mighty Music, featuring a mix of old demo recordings and two songs from the 1989 promotional tape, the band reformed to record a fourth album, B.A.C.K, which was released in 1999 by Die Hard Music. Then in 2000, Artillery decided to split up again.

In 2007, the band released a limited edition 4-CD boxset entitled Through the Years, which contains the band's four studio albums and all their demo material.

On 6 November 2007, Michael Stützer confirmed on the official Artillery website that they were once again active. However, longtime Artillery singer Flemming Rönsdorf did not participate. On 27 November the same year, it was confirmed that singer Søren Adamsen would be the new frontman. This line-up recorded two albums – namely, When Death Comes from 2009 and My Blood from 2011.

On 12 April 2012, drummer Carsten Nielsen announced that he was leaving the band after a US/South America tour in May that year. He was replaced by Josua Madsen. On 26 September the same year, it was also announced that Søren Adamsen had left the band and was replaced by Michael Bastholm Dahl. The new Artillery lineup was working on a new album entitled Legions, which they began recording in February 2013, and which was released on Metal Blade on 26 November 2013. On 7 October 2013, Metal Blade released the first video single from Legions in the form of the track "Chill My Bones (Burn My Flesh)". Legions was followed three years later by Penalty by Perception.

On 15 July 2018, Artillery announced on their Facebook page they were making a new album. This album, titled The Face of Fear, was released on 16 November 2018.

Guitarist and founding member Morten Stützer died suddenly on 2 October 2019; the surviving members of Artillery immediately announced that they would continue performing in his honor and he was replaced by Kræn Meier. The band released their first song in two years "The Last Journey", digitally and on vinyl, on 16 October 2020. The song serves as a tribute dedication to Morten Stützer and includes vocals from two of Artillery's former singers Flemming Rønsdorf and Søren Adamsen.

On 7 May 2021 Artillery released their tenth album, simply called X, produced in the Medley Studios in Copenhagen. The band toured worldwide in support of the album.

As of June 2022, Artillery has begun working on new music for their eleventh studio album, with a 2023 release date planned.

Members

Current
Michael Bastholm Dahl – vocals (2012–present)
Michael Stützer – guitars (1983–1991, 1998–2000, 2007–present)
Peter Thorslund – bass (1988–1991, 2007–present)
Kræn Meier – guitars (2019–present)

Past
Flemming Rönsdorf – vocals (1984–1991, 1998–2000)
Per Onink – vocals (1982–1983)
Carsten Lohmann – vocals (1983–1984)
Søren Nico Adamsen – vocals (2007–2012)
Jørgen Sandau – rhythm guitars (1982–1988)
Morten Stützer – guitars (1988–1991, 1998–2000, 2007–2019; his death), bass (1983–1988, 1998–2000)
Per Moller Jensen – drums (1998–2000)
Carsten Nielsen – drums (1982–1991, 2007–2012)
Benny Petersen - guitars (1982-1983)
Pete Hurricane - bass (1982-1983)
Josua Madsen – drums (2012–2023) died 2023

Timeline

Discography

Studio albums
Fear of Tomorrow (1985)
Terror Squad (1987)
By Inheritance (1990)
B.A.C.K. (1999)
When Death Comes (2009)
My Blood (2011)
 Legions (2013)
 Penalty by Perception (2016)
 The Face of Fear (2018)
 X (2021)

Compilation albums
Deadly Relics (1998)
 In the Trash (2019)

Box sets
Through the Years (2007)

Live albums & DVDs
One Foot in the Grave – The Other One in the Trash (2008, Metal Mind Productions)

References

External links

 Official website
 All Artillery lyrics at LyricsMania
 
 Khomaniac – free demo MP3 (6.3 MB) of the song Khomaniac from the album Deadly Relics (originally the 1989 promo tape), provided by Mighty Music

Danish thrash metal musical groups
Musical groups established in 1982
Musical groups disestablished in 1991
Musical groups reestablished in 1998
Musical groups disestablished in 2000
Musical groups reestablished in 2007
Musical quintets
1982 establishments in Denmark
Metal Mind Productions artists
Metal Blade Records artists
Neat Records artists
Roadrunner Records artists